Egmont Roderich Carl von Rauch (8 January 1829 in Potsdam – 26 August 1875 in Oranienburg) was a cavalry officer and later colonel in the Prussian Army. He also founded the (Saxon-Thuringian Horse and Horse Breeding Association) and the horse races in Halle (Saale). He was born in Potsdam and died in Oranienburg. He was the youngest son of Friedrich Wilhelm von Rauch.

External links 

1829 births
1875 deaths
Prussian Army personnel
Egmont
Horse breeders
Military personnel from Potsdam